Shadow Lake can refer to:

 Shadow Lake (Kawartha Lakes), Ontario, Canada
 Shadow Lake, at Musselman Lake, Ontario, Canada
 Shadow Lake, Washington, a census-designated place (CDP) in the United States
 Shadow Lake Dam, Monmouth County, New Jersey, United States
 Shadow Lake Formation, a geological unit in Ontario, Canada

See also
 Shadow (disambiguation)